Pachyrhynchus  is a genus of weevils in the family Curculionidae. Most species are found on Southeast Asian islands.

Description
Pachyrhynchus have aposematic coloration. They are flightless, with completely fused elytra. The eggs are inserted into plant tissues. The larvae will then develop and feed inside the stems of the host plants.

The pattern of diversification in this genus suggests stepping-stone dispersal. It is hypothesized that these flightless insects disperse from one island to another by rafting on their host plants. This could be facilitated by the wood-boring life-style of the eggs and larvae, as well as the air cavity under the fused elytra that help adults to float. However, experiments with Pachyrhynchus jitanasaius suggest that survival of adults in water—fresh, brackish, or marine—is low (most died within 12 hours, and no individual survived longer than 40 hours). On the other hand, the larvae living in Barringtonia asiatica fruit is higher, with a fraction of larvae surviving six days of sea water exposure and successfully emerging as adults. This suggests that the eggs and larvae are the primary dispersive stages in Pachyrhynchus.

Species 
Species include:

References 

 Catalogue of Life
 Barry.fotopage.ru
 Online Resource on Philippine Beetles 
 Wtaxa

Entiminae
Curculionidae genera
Taxa named by Gustaf Johan Billberg